The 2011 Superclásico de las Américas – Copa Doctor Nicolás Leoz was the first edition of the Superclásico de las Américas. After a 0–0 draw in the first leg, Brazil beat Argentina by 2–0 and conquered their first title.

Venues

Matches
The order of the legs was determined by a drawing of lots.

First leg

|valign="top"|
|style="vertical-align:top; width:50%;"|

|}

Second leg

|valign="top"|
|style="vertical-align:top; width:50%;"|

|}

References

2011
2011
2011
2011–12 in Argentine football
2011 in Brazilian football
September 2011 sports events in South America
Football in Buenos Aires